Mary Jo Duffy (born February 9, 1954) is an American comic book editor and writer, known for her work for Marvel Comics in the 1980s and DC Comics and Image Comics in the 1990s.

Biography
A native of the New York City area, Duffy attended Wellesley College. As a young woman, she had letters published in Marvel Comics letter columns in the mid-1970s. She made an in-comic appearance as an autograph seeker in Iron Man #103 (Oct. 1977). Her first credit as editor appeared in The Defenders #61 cover dated July 1978.

Her writing work for Marvel, which began as an assistant to Archie Goodwin, included Conan the Barbarian, Fallen Angels, Power Man and Iron Fist, Star Wars, Wolverine, and a St. Francis of Assisi biography Francis, Brother of the Universe. Her run on Power Man and Iron Fist was the longest and most successful of the series, and was noted for using a lighthearted, tongue-in-cheek approach at a time when Marvel was pushing darker and more serious stories.

In the 1990s, she worked for other publishers, including DC Comics, where she wrote the first 14 issues of Catwoman. For Rob Liefeld's Extreme Studios imprint of Image Comics, she wrote every issue of the first Glory series, between March 1995 and April 1997, the last six of which were released by Liefeld's Maximum Press after his departure from Image. She also worked on the screenplays for the horror films Puppet Master 4 (1993) and Puppet Master 5 (1994) for Full Moon Features.

In the early 2000s, she co-wrote the last issue of Marvel's Defenders vol. 2 and the six issues of the follow-up series The Order with Kurt Busiek, while working at a financial services company in Lower Manhattan. Her work at that company included meeting planning, editing, proofreading, and packaging for a comic book published by the company. From 2003 to 2006, she also wrote the English script adaptations of Naruto for Viz Media.

She now works as a receptionist at the U.S. Immigration Office in New York and has been largely absent from the publishing scene. She made multiple announcements on her Facebook page that she created a new company to self-publish her work and incorporated Armin Armadillo Publishers in 2008. As of 2013, the company is listed as inactive.

Bibliography

Aria Press 

 A Distant Soil (backup story) #2, 9 (1992–1994)

Beyond 

 Writer's Block 2003 (2003)

Blue Sky Blue (self-published) 

 Nestrobber #1–2 (1992–1994)

Claypool Comics
 Elvira: Mistress of the Dark #1–6, 111 (1993, 2002)

Dark Horse Comics
 Dark Horse Presents #56, 58, 67–69 (1991–1993)

DC Comics
 9-11: The World's Finest Comic Book Writers & Artists Tell Stories to Remember, Volume Two (2002)  
 Batman #413 (1987) 
 Batman Black and White #4 (1996) 
 Catwoman #1–14 (1993–1994)  
 Detective Comics #582 (1988)

Eclipse Comics 

 Night Music #3 (1985)

Image Comics
 Bloodpool #2, Special #1 (1995–1996)
 Glory #1–15, #0 (1995–1996)
Glory/Celestine: Dark Angel #1 (1996)

Marvel Comics
 
 Akira #1–37 (English adaptation) (1988–1996)  
 The Amazing Spider-Man #278 (1986)  
 Bizarre Adventures #27–28 (1981)  
 Chuck Norris: Karate Kommandos #1–3 (1987)  
 Classic X-Men #18, 20 (backup stories) (1988)  
 Conan the Barbarian #146 (1983)  
 Daredevil #157 (1979)
 Defenders #69 (1979)
 Defenders vol. 2 #12 (with Kurt Busiek) (2002)  
 Doom 2099 #25 (1995)  
 Epic Illustrated #18–19, 21, 25, 30 (1983–1985)  
 Fallen Angels #1–8 (1987)  
 Francis, Brother of the Universe #1 (1980)  
 Heroes for Hope Starring the X-Men #1 (1985)  
 The Incredible Hulk Annual #11 (backup story) (1982)  
Kickers, Inc. #3 (with Tom DeFalco) (1987)
 Marvel Comics Presents #14, 42, 56, 80 (1989–1991)  
 Marvel Fanfare #10–11, 14, 38, 50 (1983–1990)  
 Marvel Graphic Novel: The Punisher Assassins' Guild (1989)  
 Marvel Graphic Novel: Willow (1988)  
 Marvel Super-Heroes vol. 2 #5–6 (with Steve Ditko) (1991)  
 Marvel Team-Up #125 (Doctor Strange and the Scarlet Witch) (1983)  
 Marvel Treasury Edition #24 (Hercules backup story), #26 (Hercules and Wolverine backup story) (1980)
 Marvel Two-in-One #49 (The Thing and Doctor Strange) (1979)  
Memories one-shot (English adaptation) (1992)
 Moon Knight vol. 2 #5 (1985)
 The Order #1–6  (with Kurt Busiek) (2002)
 Power Man and Iron Fist #56–84 (1979–1982) 
 The Saga of Crystar, Crystal Warrior #1–11 (1983–1985)  
 Savage Sword of Conan #83 (1982)  
 Speedball #3, 5–10 (1988–1989)  
 Star Wars #24, 70–77, 79–82, 85, 87–88, 90–97, 99–107, Annual #3 (1979–1986) 
 Uncanny X-Men Annual #8 (with Chris Claremont) (1984)
 What If...? #27 (X-Men), #34 (1981–1982)  
 Wolverine vol. 2 #25–30 (1990)  
 X-Factor Annual #2 (1987)

Maximum Press
 Glory #17–22 (1996–1997)
Glory/Celestine: Dark Angel #3 (1996)

Viz Media 

 Naruto #1–10 (English adaptation) (2003–2006)

WaRP Graphics
 Elfquest #21 (text article) (1985)

References

External links
 
 Jo Duffy at the Unofficial Handbook of Marvel Comics Creators
  
 
 

1954 births
American comics writers
Comic book editors
Female comics writers
Living people
Marvel Comics writers
Wellesley College alumni
Writers from New York City